Oxisopred is a synthetic glucocorticoid corticosteroid which was never marketed.

References

Glucocorticoids
Triketones
Triols
Abandoned drugs